Goya ovaliger is a species of snout moth in the genus Goya. It was described by André Blanchard in 1975 and is known from the US state of Texas.

References

External links
Journal of The Lepidopterists' Society: 1978-32(1)55

Moths described in 1975
Anerastiini
Moths of North America